The Forfeit is a 1919 American silent Western film directed by Frank Powell and starring House Peters, Jane Miller and William Human.

Cast
 House Peters as Jeffrey Masters
 Jane Miller as Elvine Van Blooren
 William Human as Bob Whitstone
 Hector V. Sarno as Sikem Bruce
 L.H. Welles as Bud Tristram
 Blanche Abbott as Nan Tristram
 George Murdock as Dug McFarlane

References

Bibliography
 Goble, Alan. The Complete Index to Literary Sources in Film. Walter de Gruyter, 1999.

External links
 

1919 films
1919 Western (genre) films
American black-and-white films
Films directed by Frank Powell
Films distributed by W. W. Hodkinson Corporation
Pathé Exchange films
Silent American Western (genre) films
1910s English-language films
1910s American films